Huaxi is a town of Hongya County, Sichuan, China. , it has one residential community and eight villages under its administration.

References

Towns in Sichuan
Hongya County